Torrendia is a genus of agaric fungi in the family Amanitaceae in part defined by being sequestrate. By molecular analyses the genus was shown to be part of Amanita and has now been placed in synonymy with Amanita. The type species, Torrendia pulchella, was first described by Italian mycologist Giacomo Bresadola in 1902, based on material collected in Portugal and sent to him by Camille Torrend. It has been renamed in Amanita as Amanita torrendii.

Species 
Torrendia arenaria
Torrendia deformans
Torrendia grandis
Torrendia inculta
Torrendia pulchella

References

Amanitaceae
Taxa named by Giacomo Bresadola